Danny Hughes (born 4 December 1963) is a former professional Australian rules footballer who played for the Melbourne Football Club and Adelaide Football Club in the Australian Football League (AFL).

A fullback, Hughes was a premiership player with Port Adelaide prior to transferring to Melbourne. He was Melbourne's best and fairest winner in 1985 and represented South Australia at interstate football and was awarded All Australian selection for his performance in the 1988 Adelaide Bicentennial Carnival. He returned to South Australia in 1991 and played in Adelaide's inaugural AFL season but retired at year's end. He continued to play with Port Adelaide in the SANFL until 1993.

Statistics

|- style="background-color: #EAEAEA"
! scope="row" style="text-align:center" | 1984
|style="text-align:center;"|
| 10 || 11 || 2 || 2 || 74 || 33 || 107 || 23 ||  || 0.2 || 0.2 || 6.7 || 3.0 || 9.7 || 2.1 || 
|-
! scope="row" style="text-align:center" | 1985
|style="text-align:center;"|
| 10 || 22 || 1 || 4 || 190 || 75 || 265 || 53 ||  || 0.0 || 0.2 || 8.6 || 3.4 || 12.0 || 2.4 || 
|- style="background-color: #EAEAEA"
! scope="row" style="text-align:center" | 1986
|style="text-align:center;"|
| 10 || 15 || 6 || 2 || 154 || 56 || 210 || 47 ||  || 0.4 || 0.1 || 10.3 || 3.7 || 14.0 || 3.1 || 
|-
! scope="row" style="text-align:center" | 1987
|style="text-align:center;"|
| 10 || 22 || 2 || 1 || 209 || 41 || 250 || 57 || 16 || 0.1 || 0.0 || 9.5 || 1.9 || 11.4 || 2.6 || 0.7
|- style="background-color: #EAEAEA"
! scope="row" style="text-align:center" | 1988
|style="text-align:center;"|
| 10 || 18 || 1 || 0 || 141 || 33 || 174 || 36 || 19 || 0.1 || 0.0 || 7.8 || 1.8 || 9.7 || 2.0 || 1.1
|-
! scope="row" style="text-align:center" | 1989
|style="text-align:center;"|
| 10 || 19 || 4 || 3 || 123 || 39 || 162 || 35 || 15 || 0.2 || 0.2 || 6.5 || 2.1 || 8.5 || 1.8 || 0.8
|- style="background-color: #EAEAEA"
! scope="row" style="text-align:center" | 1990
|style="text-align:center;"|
| 10 || 17 || 7 || 2 || 119 || 43 || 162 || 33 || 17 || 0.4 || 0.1 || 7.0 || 2.5 || 9.5 || 1.9 || 1.0
|-
! scope="row" style="text-align:center" | 1991
|style="text-align:center;"|
| 19 || 11 || 1 || 1 || 56 || 33 || 89 || 18 || 6 || 0.1 || 0.1 || 5.1 || 3.0 || 8.1 || 1.6 || 0.5
|- class="sortbottom"
! colspan=3| Career
! 135
! 24
! 15
! 1066
! 353
! 1419
! 302
! 73
! 0.2
! 0.1
! 7.9
! 2.6
! 10.5
! 2.2
! 0.8
|}

References

External links

1963 births
Living people
Australian rules footballers from South Australia
Adelaide Football Club players
Melbourne Football Club players
Port Adelaide Football Club (SANFL) players
Port Adelaide Football Club players (all competitions)
South Australian State of Origin players
Keith 'Bluey' Truscott Trophy winners
All-Australians (1953–1988)